Doris kerguelenensis is a species of sea slug, a dorid nudibranch, a marine gastropod mollusc in the family Dorididae.

Distribution
The type locality for this species is the Kerguelen Islands. It has been widely reported all round Antarctica but molecular investigations suggest that it consists of a species complex and many of the synonymised names may be valid.

References

Dorididae
Gastropods described in 1884